The barrens darter (Etheostoma forbesi) is a species of freshwater ray-finned fish, a darter from the subfamily Etheostomatinae, part of the family Percidae, which also contains the perches, ruffes and pikeperches. It is endemic to the eastern United States, where it is only known from the Cumberland ecoregion. It inhabits generally quiet pools in headwaters and creeks, often sheltering underneath large rocks. This species forms part of the Etheostoma squamiceps species complex within the subgenus Catonotus and it is further part of the "blackfin darter"  group. The specific name honours Stephen A. Forbes, who was a noted ichthyologist member of the Illinois Natural History Survey during the early part of the 20th century.

References

Etheostoma
Taxa named by Patrick A. Ceas
Taxa named by Lawrence M. Page
Fish described in 1992
Fish of the United States